John W. Archer was an American politician from Maryland. He served as a member of the Maryland House of Delegates, representing Harford County, from 1910 to 1911.

Career
Archer was a Democrat. He served as a member of the Maryland House of Delegates, representing Harford County, from 1910 to 1911.

References

Year of birth missing
Place of birth missing
Year of death missing
Democratic Party members of the Maryland House of Delegates